Barbatia obliquata is a species of bivalve belonging to the family Arcidae.

The species is found from South Africa to Japan. It has the common name of oblique ark shell.

References

obliquata
Bivalves described in 1828
Edible molluscs